Marta Shpak (Starling) (Марта Шпак) is a Ukrainian folk-pop singer, songwriter, actress, and choreographer with a unique lyric voice and a strong track record of education. Music and Beauty Business professional. She delighted thousands of people throughout several European countries and Canada with her beautiful and powerful singing. Shpak first started performing professionally at the age of five and has released five albums. Marta Shpak holds a master's degree in Arts from York University Canada (Theater and Performance Studies Program) and a master's degree in Choreography and in Management from National Academy of Government Managerial Staff of Culture and Arts (Kyiv, Ukraine). The singer has been named The Honored Artist of Ukraine in 2009 by President of Ukraine, in recognition of her dedication as the main soloist of the State Ensemble of songs and dance of the Ministry of Internal Affairs of Ukraine.

Early life
Marta Shpak was born in Perehinske (Ivano-Frankivsk region), Ukraine. Music was her main interest and hobby during her childhood. She attended the children's school of arts, tours with the folk ensemble "Malenki Boiky" (Маленькі бойки). Her mother Nataliya Shpak, played an important part in giving her music lessons and provided inspiration.  At the age of 5, Marta and her sister Ann, first started performing and winning competitions at All-Ukrainian and International folk festivals.

Career
In 1999 she entered the State College of Arts in Chernivtsi, where she studied Choreography and began her career as a solo singer, collaborating with composer and teacher of vocals Oksana Kyrylyuk. Her first studio tracks "Rainbow Paradise" and Bukovina were written by Valeriy Syrotiuk (Ukrainian priest) and became very popular in that region of Ukraine. 
From 2003 to 2008 Marta Shpak attended the National Academy of Government Managerial Staff of Culture and Arts in Kyiv where she obtained her master's degree in Modern choreography and Management of organizations and Performing Arts; become a Soloist/Singer of the State Ensemble of songs and dance of the Ministry of Internal Affairs of Ukraine and an Actress of the poetic theatre "Mushlya" ("The Shell", director – Sergiy Arkhypchuk). In 2019 Shpak became an MA candidate at York University, Toronto, Canada, working within Theatre and Performance Program at the Faculty of Fine Arts, TV and Media.

2009 "The Honoured National Artist of Ukraine" 

 In 2009 Marta Shpak was awarded the title The Honored National Artist of Ukraine by the President of Ukraine in recognition of her dedication as the main soloist of the State Ensemble of songs and dancing of the Ministry of Internal Affairs of Ukraine, whose performances have inspired and rallied the support of thousands of listeners in Ukraine and around the world.

2009 also marked her first appearance in a music video "The Star in the Sky" which was directed by well-known Ukrainian film director Taras Khymych.

2010
Marta Shpak recorded an album with Ukrainian rock-band "S.K.Y" and recorded a music video singing a duet with the band's front-man Oleg Sobchuk for the song "Story".

2011
Marta recorded an original musical project "Insurgent Tango" with the singer and author of this project Orest Cymbala and the academic instrumental ensemble "High Castle" (Lviv). All the songs are written by a hero of Ukraine and poet – Olga Ilkiv.

2012
Marta Shpak, along with children's folklore ensemble "Malenki Boiky" represented Ukraine with their performances at the Vatican, in honor of the Ukrainian Christmas tree at St. Peter's Square for Pope Benedict XVI. Shpak also performed in Moscow celebrating Ukraine's Day in Russia and the Anniversary of the birth of Ukrainian poet and Kobzar Taras Shevchenko.

2013
Shpak toured Canada (Winnipeg, Montreal and Toronto) in support of her new album "The Star in a Heaven". 
She also supported Ukrainians with her performances at the EuroMaidan in Kyiv in the first days of the Euro Revolution.

2014
Marta was a passionate supporter of peace and freedom for the Ukrainian Nation and its people in their struggle to obtain true freedom and democracy during the ongoing tragic events and war that is currently happening in Ukraine. She performed at many Ukrainian meetings and concerts in Montreal, Toronto and Winnipeg. Her most recent supportive performances were at Toronto's Independence Day at Centennial Park and Multi-Cultural Pavilions during the Folkloramma Festival in Winnipeg, Manitoba. Shpak also performed for The League of Ukrainian Canadians in honour of their 65th Anniversary, in memory of the "Heavenly Hundred" and all the Heroes who died in war!

2015
Marta Shpak is a student in Canada. She is continuing her master's degree in Management and studying Career exploration at Sheridan College and Business English for International professionals at University of Toronto.
Shpak is also collaborating with Canadian multi-instrumental musician, songwriter and producer Denny DeMarchi, who is notable as a rock concert tour musician for the well-known Irish band The Cranberries and Dolores O'Riordan during her Solo world's tours. DeMarchi is also known for his role as the keyboardist who played the signature keyboard notes for the popular 1990 No. 1 Billboard hit song More Than Words Can Say by the band Alias, which features his brother, Steve DeMarchi on guitar.
 
Marta Shpak performing at the Ukrainian festivals and fundraising music events in Canada.

2016
Marta Shpak recorded and released her new song with Denny DeMarchi Denny DeMarchi "Zolota", dedicated to the 25th Anniversary of the Independence Day of Ukraine. Lyrics by Roman Virastyuk.

2017
Marta Shpak taking [Acting for Film and Television] course at the [Toronto Academy of Acting] with movie director George D'Amato from the US, known for "The Final" (1998), "Blur" (2015) and "Palace Guard" (1991).http://torontoacademyofacting.com A Singer is working on upcoming music projects with her music producers Denny DeMarchi and Ihor Balan.

2018
Recording artists Marta Shpak and Denny DeMarchi released their debut music video “Christmas Day”. Filmed in Canada and Ukraine by Francis Coral Mellon and Volodymyr Mussur, the song touches the heart for the Christmas and New Year Holiday Season.

2019
Marta Shpak won a big Gant from the York University and started her MA Theatre and Performance Program at the [Faculty of Arts, Media, Performance & Design] within the Centre of Film and Theatre. Her research work is based on the Culture of Politics and Environmental Activism; Performance Ethnography and Multiculturalism, supervised by Dr.Magdalena Kazubowski-Houston – Associate Professor of Theatre at York University. 
The singer was also invited to perform at the Ethnographic Research-Creation Project "The Morning I Died" by Lynn Hutchinson Lee in collaboration with Rajat Nayyar, Becky Gold, Shawn Kazubowski-Houston, Amadeusz Kazubowski-Houston and Centre for Imaginative Ethnography and Sensorium – Centre for Digital Arts and Technology.

2020
Shpak defended her master's degree in ART (Theatre and Performance Studies program) from York University.

2021
Marta Shpak is working on her first English Album and upcoming music videos with Canadian musicians and movie directors; continuing her researches based on Culture of Politics and Environmental Activism; preparing to represent her scientistic research-creation project at the 2021 World Children, Youth, and Performance Conference at Young People's Theatre in Toronto .

2022 

Due to the brutal Russian invasion of Ukraine on February 24, 2022, Marta Shpak, together with all the artists, has started to support her home country with performances and humanitarian work. As a result, she was invited to perform State Anthem of Ukraine  at the  27th Annual Mississauga Arts Awards - MARTYS 2022. 

"Grateful and proud to say Thank you to Canada for supporting Ukraine during this tragic time and call the society to help to share the truth of genocide against Ukrainian Nation," – said Marta.

Among many famous local politicians, sponsors, guests and artists, the event visited Mississauga's current and previous mayors - Bonnie Crombie and Hazel McCallion, Mississauga Arts Council executive director - Mike Douglas, Susan Durnin, Sherri Murray, Demetrius Nath, Mariya Tsyaska, Ron Duquette and others.

Marta recorded this song with Canadian musician and producer Denny DeMarchi (guitar) and Ukrainian violinist Bohdan Vatsyk in 2015 after the first year of war in Eastern Ukraine and the annexation of Crimea. Due to popular demand, this track was released in April 2022 on all music platforms. Millions of people gather at rallies and different shows to stand with Ukraine during its fight for Freedom, Justice, and Human Rights. We are grateful! 

#StandwithUkraine #CлаваУкраїні

Marta Shpak is happy that her scientific achievements and connections are also helping to open the door to North America for Ukrainian refugees today. She has already opened visas to Canada for dozens of Ukrainians, won free plane tickets for them, issued all the necessary documents upon arrival, found a job and even free temporary housing.

Ukrainian singer sang her patriotic songs at the Independence Day concert in Toronto, including "Ukraina-Maty", "Zhuravlyna dolya" and a dedication to the Heroes who gave their lives for Ukraine - "Plyve kacha".

2023 
In January 2023, Marta sang the National Anthems of Ukraine and Canada at the Ontario Hockey League match between the Ottawa 67's and the Barrie Colts. Artur Cholach - a player of Ukrainian origin scored the final winning goal for the team of the Barrie, which hospitably hosts Ukrainians. Marta's father Dmytro Shpak started the game with two hockey players and received a historic puck as a gift. All these moments supported Garry Hopkins - CEO of IOOF Seniors Homes Inc. Thanks to this noble man and his team, more than 20 families with children fleeing from the tragic war found shelter in the residential premises of their company. "The IOOF Seniors Homes is happy to be able to do our part to offer compassion, support, and most importantly, free living accommodations and apartments to Ukrainian families fleeing armed conflict during the tragic crisis affecting their home country." (@IOOF Seniors Homes Inc.).
The singer is grateful to Mrs. Oksana Yakusha, Garry Hopkins and to the community of the city of Barry for the incredible hospitality and support of the entire Ukrainian community: - "We will never forget such historical moments and events. God bless your families. You are our true brothers and sisters. Thank you - Canada!" 

On February 24th, 2023, near the city hall of Barrie, Marta Shpak and Ukrainian children sang the National Anthems of Ukraine and Canada opening a Ukrainian rally due to one year of the war. A singer supported the event with her well-known songs, as well as the city council representatives, including the mayor - Alex Nuttall.

Awards
"The Song Premiere" 2008, Grand-Prix
"Golden barn", 2007, Grand-Prix
"Autumn Randewu", 2006, Grand-Prix
"The West of 21 century", Grand-Prix
"Volodymyr", 2004, Grand-Prix
"On Svityaz waves", 2004, 2nd prize
"Wesprem 2002", Hungary, 3rd prize
"Kyiv Student Spring", 2006, 1st prize
"The Song of Heart", 2001, 3rd prize
"The Vernisage of Songs", 2001, 1st prize
"The Ukrainian Family", 2004, 1st prize
"The Ancient castle", 2000, 1st prize
"The Morning sunrise", 1995, 3rd prize
"The Fortune’s Nightingale",
"Chernivtsi" 1995, 2nd prize in genres "author song" and "folk song"
"The Singing Family", Kyiv 1995, 2nd prize

Discography
2006 – "Enlighted’, Molotov 20, Marta Shpak & Sergiy Gera & RC "Atlantic"
2008 – "Na svitanku", Marta Shpak
2009 – "Songs of Boykivshchyna" (Бойківські співанки), Marta Shpak
2011 – "Insurgent Tango" (Повстанське танго) – Marta Shpak, Orest Tsymbala, Olga Ilkiv and "Vysokyy zamok" orchestra of Lviv Philharmonic led by Grammy winner Andriy Yatskiv.
2013 – "V nebi zironka" – Marta Shpak
2021 – "Leleka" – Marta Shpak. Best Songs

References 

Living people
Ukrainian folk singers
Year of birth missing (living people)
21st-century Ukrainian women singers
Ukrainian folk-pop singers